Eric Lane (born November 16, 1976) is an American actor from Chicago, Illinois. He is known for R. Kelly's hip-hopera, Trapped in the Closet, as the character Twan, from Chapter 7 and on.

He also appeared in the 2006 film Waist Deep, the lead role in the 2008 direct to video film Tactical, and is the main character in the 2014 short film Night Thrasher:RAVE based on the Marvel comics superhero character Night Thrasher.  He currently plays the role Black Magnum from the Amazon.com series The Girls & Rodney as well as the character Frank the Barber in the comedy series REL on FOX.

References

External links
 

1976 births
Living people
African-American male actors
Male actors from Chicago
American male film actors
21st-century African-American people
20th-century African-American people